Buntanetap is an orally-administered small molecule inhibitor of several neurotoxic proteins that is under investigation in the treatment of Alzheimer's disease, Frontotemporal dementia, Chronic traumatic encephalopathy and Parkinson's disease. It is the (+) enantiomer of phenserine, as the (-) enantiomer also has unwanted anticholinergic effects. It is currently in phase III trials for the treatment of Parkinson's.

Development

Although the ongoing clinical trials yet have affirmed if buntanetap can be pursued as a novel Alzheimer's disease's treatment, buntanetap has demonstrated its potential by impeding neurodegenerative mechanisms. Buntanetap performs in a noncholinergic manner, including but not limited to, the suppressing action on APP translation and β-secretase Activity. The β-secretase Activity is instigated by the accumulation of Aβ peptides which are augmented along with aging of the human brain. In clinical demonstrations with brain cell-lines, two contrasting forms showed the noncholinergic mechanism to an equal extent, with respect to their potency and efficacy.

Buntanetap is relatively well tolerated with the administration of doses, even higher than the maximally tolerable dose of (-)-phenserine. In vivo, the levels of APP protein in the cortex were reduced by buntanetap with an ED50 of ???(median Effective Dose). The β-secretase activity in the mouse brain also could be reduced with elevated doses of 35 and 50 mg/kg. Overall, the dose range from 10 mg to 160 mg of buntanetap is well tolerated and generally adopted in clinical uses. With higher doses, supralinear increase of plasma levels was shown, indicating the saturable metabolism, which is a factor related to toxicity. Studies have shown that plasma levels of buntanetap reducing brain Aβ levels are equal or greater in humans than mice. Once buntanetap is dosed over 160 mg, gastro-intestinal related symptoms including nausea and vomiting, were manifested. The drug additionally presents the rapid absorption rate, occurred within an hour or two. Pharmacokinetics of buntanetap was overall kept linear.

References

Carbamates
Anilines
Indoles
Neuroprotective agents
Alzheimer's disease research
Parkinson's disease